ABC 7 may refer to one of the following television stations in the United States:

Owned and operated stations
 KABC-TV, Los Angeles, California
 KGO-TV, San Francisco, California
 WABC-TV, New York City, New York
 WLS-TV, Chicago, Illinois

Affiliate stations
 KATV, Little Rock, Arkansas
 KETV, Omaha, Nebraska
 KHQA-DT2, a digital channel of KHQA-TV, Hannibal, Missouri/Quincy, Illinois
 KLTV, Tyler, Texas
 KMGH-TV, Denver, Colorado
 KOAT-TV, Albuquerque, New Mexico
 KRCR-TV, Chico / Redding, California
 KSWO-TV, Lawton, Oklahoma
 KTGM, Guam (cable channel; broadcasts on channel 14)
 KVIA-TV, El Paso, Texas
 KVII-TV, Amarillo, Texas
 WBBJ-TV, Jackson, Tennessee
 WDAM-DT2, a digital channel of WDAM-TV, Hattiesburg, Mississippi
 WJLA-TV, Washington, D.C.
 WKBW-TV, Buffalo, New York
 WPBN-DT2, a digital channel of WPBN-TV, Traverse City, Michigan
 WTRF-DT3, a digital channel of WTRF-TV,  Wheeling, West Virginia
 WVII-TV, Bangor, Maine
 WWSB, Sarasota, Florida (cable channel; broadcasts on channel 40)
 WXYZ-TV, Detroit, Michigan
 WZVN-TV, Naples, Florida (cable channel; broadcasts on channel 26)
 ZFB-TV, Bermuda (broadcasts on channel 19.7; branding is by former analog channel number)

Formerly affiliated

 KBZK, Bozeman, Montana (1987 to 1993)
 WJHG-TV, Panama City, Florida (1953 to 1982)
 WNAC-TV, Boston, Massachusetts (1961 to 1972)
 WTVW, Evansville, Indiana (1956 to 1995)

See also
 Circle 7 logo